Magarpatta  (  Land of Magar family) is a 450 acre, privately owned gated community in the Hadapsar area of Pune, India. It has a commercial area, residential area, hospital with several specialisations, shopping and  malls, restaurants, a gym, Aditi Garden (a 25-acre park), and schools. 30% (more specially 32.6%)  of the area is made up of green space. There is a commercial complex named "Destination Centre" located herein. Construction began in 2000 and continues to develop itself with newer housing societies.

Management
Magarpatta was originally a farmland in Hadapsar, owned by the Magar (Patil) family of Hadapsar. Satish Magar is the chairman & managing director of the township.

Companies

CyberCity

Pentagon

Residential clusters
Magarpatta has various residential clusters for different needs and income groups. Names of these clusters are based on different flower species, and they are listed below in order from oldest to newest.

Apartment clusters

Villa clusters

Awards
 Magarpatta won accolades at the Sydney World Congress of Metropolis in 2008. The Maharashtra Economic Development Council lists it among the Top 10 Success Stories of the State.
 Magarpatta won the Best Residential Property in India at the CNBC Awaaz-Crisil-Credai Real Estate Awards, 2009.

In popular culture

Film
 The climax scenes of the film Sivaji: The Boss (a 2007 Indian Tamil masala film) was shot at the Magarpatta City SEZ towers.
 Mirchi (a 2013 Telugu action drama) was also shot in Magarpatta City.
 Andhadhun (a 2018 Hindi dark comedy thriller) was also shot in Magarpatta City.
Many commercial advertisements have been shot in Magarpatta City. It has also been a host to a lot of movie stars.

See also
 Nanded City
 Hadapsar

References

External links
Magarpatta City community portal
Magarpatta's success story on Rediff
Rediff article on Magarpatta
Magarpatta in the Financial Express
Magarpatta city: India’s first successful land pooling plan

Neighbourhoods in Pune
High-technology business districts in India
Economy of Pune
Software technology parks in Pune